Deborah Magid is a theater artist living in Cleveland, Ohio. Previously a Broadway actor and singer with The Santa Fe Opera, since 2008 her concentration has been largely in the arena of playwriting. Magid is a member of the Cleveland Play House Playwrights Unit, Dobama Theatre' Playwrights Gym, International Centre for Women Playwrights, American Composers Forum, the Dramatists Guild of America, and founder of SWAN Day - CLE.

Plays
(2015) Rouge Étude or How Sherlock Holmes Became a Misogynist workshop-production at Cleveland Public Theatre Big Box series of new works
(2013) Jacob’s Ladder Surface produced at Cleveland Public Theatre
(2013) The Secret Life of Birds produced at Dobama Theatre
(2012) Cowboy Poet produced at Los Alamos Little Theatre
(2012) A Tudor Tale produced at Cantores Cleveland
(2012) The Ring produced at Dobama Theatre
(2011) Being Earnest produced at Dobama Theatre
(2011) The Berlioz Project produced at Cleveland Public Theatre
(2011) Pen Name produced at Dramatists Guild Friday Night Footlights
(2010) Debate Your Future! produced at Cleveland Museum of Art
(2010) Descent of a Diva produced at Melbourne Fringe Festival
(2010) The Consequence of Impression produced at Remy Bumppo Theatre Company
(2008) Costumbrismo, or Khandihba Wars produced at Cleveland Public Theatre

References

Living people
21st-century American dramatists and playwrights
American stage actresses
Year of birth missing (living people)
21st-century American actresses